The Roxi Pro France 2015 was an event of the Association of Surfing Professionals for the 2015 ASP World Tour.

This event was held from 06 to 17 October at Landes forest, (Aquitaine, France) and opposed by 18 surfers.

The tournament was won by Tyler Wright (AUS), who beat T. Weston-Webb (HAW) in final.

Round 1

Round 2

Round 3

Round 4

Quarter finals

Semi finals

Final

References

Roxy Pro France
2015 World Surf League
2015 in French sport